Iski is a Ramu language of Papua New Guinea. Dialects are Breri a.k.a. Kuanga and Romkun.

References

Tamolan languages
Languages of Madang Province